"Kick It Out" is a short, fast-tempo hard rock song recorded by the rock band Heart, written by Ann Wilson.  It was released as the third and final single from the band's second album Little Queen in 1977.  When released the song did not perform as well as previous Heart singles, reaching number seventy-nine on the U.S. Billboard Hot 100 and number sixty-seven on the U.S. Cash Box Top 100.

Fellow Seattle band Foo Fighters played a version during a 2014 appearance on Late Show with David Letterman, with Ann and Nancy Wilson performing lead vocals and guitar respectively.

Cash Box called it "hard driving rock and roll" and said that it "benefits from thoughtful stylization on the part of each musician, as well as the energetic vocals of sassy Ann Wilson." Record World called it an "out-and-out" and said that "this single performs just as the title promises."

Chart performance

References

Heart (band) songs
1977 singles
1977 songs
Portrait Records singles
Song recordings produced by Mike Flicker